Shannon Airport  is an international airport located in County Clare in the Republic of Ireland. It is adjacent to the Shannon Estuary and lies halfway between Ennis and Limerick. The airport is the third busiest airport in the Republic of Ireland, and the fifth busiest on the island.

The airport has a history of pioneering in global aviation with the first transatlantic proving flight in 1945, the world's first duty-free airport opening in 1947, and Europe's first United States border preclearance facility opening in 1986. It was a busy refuelling stop for many international carriers in the 1960s, making it a gateway between Europe and the Americas. At , Shannon has the longest runway in Ireland, which allowed it to be a designated alternative landing site for the Space Shuttle.

History

Establishment 
In the late 1930s, transatlantic air traffic was dominated by flying boats, and a flying boat terminal was located at Foynes on the south side of the Shannon Estuary. However, it was realised that changing technology would require a permanent runway and airport.

In 1936, the Government of Ireland confirmed that it would develop a  site at Rineanna for the country's first transatlantic airport. The land on which the airport was to be built was boggy, and on 8 October 1936 work began to drain the land. In July 1939, a SABENA Savoia-Marchetti S.73 from Brussels via Croydon Airport was the first commercial flight to use the Rineanna airfield.

By 1942 a serviceable airport had been established and was named Shannon Airport. BOAC began scheduled service to Bristol on 21 February 1942, to provide a land plane connection between England and the flying boat terminal at Foynes. Aer Lingus began scheduled service to Dublin in August 1942.

Transatlantic service 
By the end of World War II in 1945, the existing runways at Shannon were extended to allow transatlantic flights to take off. The first Air Services Agreement between Ireland and the United States in 1945 only permitted U.S. airlines to serve Shannon, and only permitted Irish airlines to serve Boston, Chicago and New York.

On 16 September 1945 the first transatlantic proving flight, a Pan Am DC-4, landed at Shannon from Gander. On 24 October 1945, the first scheduled transatlantic commercial flight using a land plane, an American Overseas Airlines DC-4, Flagship New England, stopped at the airport on the New York City–Gander–Shannon–London route. Trans World Airlines began service between New York and Paris via Gander and Shannon on 5 February 1946, and began a Shannon-Dublin tag flight in 1971 after the US Civil Aeronautics Board threatened to ban Aer Lingus from landing in New York. Aerlinte Eireann began service from Dublin to New York via Shannon on 28 April  1958.

In 1947, the "Customs Free Airport Act" established Shannon as the world's first duty-free airport, a move promoted by Brendan O'Regan. Shannon became a model for other duty-free facilities worldwide.

In 1969, it was announced that a new government agency, Aer Rianta (now the Dublin Airport Authority), would be given responsibility for Shannon Airport. Passenger numbers at the airport reached 460,000 that year. With the increase in passengers and the introduction of the Boeing 747, it was decided that a new enlarged terminal was needed. The first commercial operation of a 747 took place in April 1971, while the new terminal officially opened in May that year.

Aeroflot service 
Aeroflot began service to Shannon in September 1975 as a stop between the Soviet Union and other Communist bloc countries such as Cuba and Angola. Aeroflot kept its own fuel storage at Shannon and allowed the airport to sell the Soviet fuel to other airlines.

The United States demanded that Ireland suspend Aeroflot's Shannon operations following the shooting down of Korean Air Lines Flight 007 in 1983, and Ireland temporarily banned Aeroflot later that year. Nonetheless, the Aeroflot operation returned and developed into a hub by the mid-1990s, with flights to New York, Chicago, Washington, Miami, and Havana, largely using Ilyushin Il-62 aircraft.

The cooperation between Aeroflot and Aer Rianta at Shannon also led to a joint venture between the two companies to open duty-free shops at Sheremetyevo Airport in 1987.

On 30 September 1994, Shannon was the site of the "circling over Shannon" diplomatic incident involving Russian President Boris Yeltsin.

The "Shannon stopover" 
Shannon introduced United States border preinspection in 1986, allowing departing passengers to the US to complete US immigration procedures at Shannon. This operation was administered by the US Justice Department, specifically the Immigration and Naturalization Service (INS). The first port director was Denis Riordan, who led the operation from 1988 to 1998. These services were extended to cover private aircraft in 2010, making Shannon the first airport in the world to offer US border preclearance for private aircraft.

In 1990, the U.S.-Irish bilateral agreement was changed to allow Irish airlines to serve Los Angeles and additional U.S. airlines to serve Dublin via Shannon. An amendment in 1993 allowed airlines to provide direct transatlantic services to Dublin, but 50% of transatlantic flights had to either originate or stop over in Shannon. During the 1990s, the airport began to struggle. However, 1996 saw the beginning of Continental Airlines flying between Dublin, Shannon and Newark, New Jersey. Shannon began to rebound in the late 1990s with the success of the Irish economy, the improving situation in Northern Ireland and an influx of American tourists. By the end of the decade Shannon had passenger numbers of 2.2 million and in the year 2000, a new £40 million terminal extension was opened.

In 2005, an agreement was reached regarding a transitional period. Beginning in November 2006 and ending in April 2008, the agreement gradually eliminated restrictions on cargo services. For passenger service, it reduced the stopover requirement and allowed Irish airlines to serve three additional U.S. destinations. Furthermore, it was agreed that at the end of this period, no restrictions would be placed on scheduled services between any airport in the one country to any airport in the other.

In 2007, the European Union and the U.S. announced that an agreement had been reached on an open skies aviation policy (EU–US Open Skies Agreement). The agreement came into effect from 30 March 2008, leading to the complete abolition of the Shannon Stopover, although this would have happened under the 2005 agreement anyway.

British Airways operated business class-only flights between London City Airport and John F. Kennedy International Airport in New York between 2009 and 2020. Of these, the westbound flights stopped for fuel in Shannon to allow them to take off from the short runway of the London City Airport, which is located in the London Docklands area. This stop also allowed passengers to clear US Customs and Immigration in Shannon rather than at JFK. Introduced in 2009, two flights per day, one of which carried the flight number BA1, were operated using A318 aircraft capable of operating steep approaches. The flights were halved in 2017, and in 2020, amid their suspension due to the COVID-19 pandemic, it was announced that the flights would not be resumed.

2000s 
Ryanair increased services and passenger numbers at the airport until 2008. In 2007, Shannon carried 3.2 million passengers. However, after a disagreement with the Dublin Airport Authority (DAA) in 2008, Ryanair announced that the number of based aircraft would reduce from four to one and 150 jobs would be lost. Services were cut by 75% and 32 Ryanair routes from the airport were reduced to eight.

CityJet launched a twice-daily route to Paris Charles de Gaulle Airport in 2008 when Aer Lingus closed its London Heathrow flights. The company based an Avro RJ85 at Shannon. More services were under consideration, including a route to London City Airport; however CityJet pulled out of Shannon in October 2009 after Aer Lingus reinstated its Heathrow flights.

Independent operation, 2012 to present 

In December 2012, it was announced that Shannon Airport would separate from the Dublin Airport Authority, who still own Dublin and Cork airports. On 31 December 2012 at 11:59 pm, Shannon Airport became a publicly owned commercial airport and is now operated and run by the Shannon Airport Authority plc. Shannon announced a target in 2012 to grow its passenger numbers to 2.5 million annually within five years. However, Shannon has fallen short of its stated targeted figure with just 1.74 million flying through the airport in 2017.

In March 2013, the new company appointed Neil Pakey as its first CEO. Traffic figures for June 2013 report an 8% increase on the previous year, the first time a traffic increase has been recorded in three years. On 21 March 2013, Ryanair announced a new twice-weekly route to Alicante, Spain to begin on 5 June for the summer months. That brought Shannon's total to 33 seasonal scheduled summer routes. In August 2013 Aer Lingus announced a 1x weekly service to Lanzarote, Canary Islands, Spain every Saturday during the winter months using an A320. In October 2013, United Airlines confirmed it will increase capacity by 88% on its Shannon-Chicago route for 2014. In late 2013, Aer Lingus announced 2 new routes to Málaga, Spain (two weekly) and to Bristol, UK (one daily). Ryanair also announced 8 new routes from Shannon to continental Europe. The new routes began from the start of April 2014, and a second Boeing 737-800 was based at Shannon to accommodate the extra 300,000 passengers a year it would bring in. The destinations announced were Berlin Schonefeld, Beauvais, Memmingen, Warsaw Modlin, Kraków, Nice, Faro, and Fuerteventura.

On 4 July 2014, the "Bank of Ireland Runway Night Run" featured 1,200 people running along Shannon's runway to raise money for charity.

In late 2014, Aer Lingus Regional operator Stobart Air said that they would close down their Shannon base in early 2015. They returned in June 2015 operating six flights weekly Birmingham service followed by six flights weekly Edinburgh service. In late 2015, they announced a new CEO for Shannon, Matthew Thomas. Ryanair announced that it will be ending its Paris and Memmingen routes in late 2016, and it also reduced its Manchester and London Stansted routes. Ryanair is aiming for 720,000 passengers in Summer 2017 even though that they were close to 800,000 in Summer 2016. In October 2016, SAS announced a new route to Stockholm from 1 August 2017 to 7 October  2017. Shortly after that, Lufthansa announced a weekly service to Frankfurt running from April to October in 2017. In September 2017 Ryanair announced a new Route to Reus. It will run through summer 2018 operating 2x weekly (Tuesdays and Saturdays) replacing the route to Berlin. The same day, Air Canada announced a new 4x weekly service to Toronto with the Boeing 737 MAX. In February 2018, Ryanair announced it would resume flights to Bristol and Liverpool from May 2018. In late 2018, Ryanair announced a new twice weekly service to Ibiza, and the resumption of flights to East Midlands, both beginning in April 2019. The East Midlands, Bristol and Ibiza flights are all being ceased at the end of the 2019 summer season due to fears of Brexit and the 737 MAX groundings. Due to the 737 MAX groundings, Air Canada and Norwegian Airlines suspended their routes to Shannon. This reduced the number of passenger by 120,000. On 23 October 2019, Lauda announced that they will launch a twice weekly flight to Shannon from their base in Vienna operating every Wednesday and Saturday. The airport handled 1,864,762 passengers in 2018. This number is the highest passenger numbers since gaining independence from the DAA.

Usage for military stopovers 
Shannon Airport has a history of foreign military use. A large part of its business in recent years has been military stopovers, currently almost all American; however, the airport was also frequently used by the Soviet military until the 1990s, since Ireland, having a traditional policy of military neutrality, was not a member of NATO. There were some restrictions, such as being carrying no arms, ammunition, or explosives, and that the flights in question did not form part of military exercises or operations. Shannon saw military transports throughout the Cold War and during the first Gulf War.

In the aftermath of the September 11 attacks, the Irish government offered the use of Shannon to the US government. When the United States invaded Iraq in 2003, the government still allowed United States Armed Forces to use the airport. This caused much controversy and was the subject of protests and a challenge brought to the High Court. As of November 2008, approximately 1.2 million troops had passed through Shannon since the beginning of the Iraq War. In 2012–2013, the military flight contracts are held by Omni Air International.

On 6 December 2005, the BBC programme Newsnight alleged that Shannon was used on at least 33 occasions by United States Central Intelligence Agency (CIA) flights, thought to be part of a US policy called extraordinary rendition. The New York Times reported the number to be 33, though referring to "Ireland" rather than Shannon, while Amnesty International has alleged the number of flights to be 50. Casement Aerodrome has seen similar reports. The United States and Ireland have denied these allegations. German Khaled El-Masri, who was mistakenly tortured by the CIA after being abducted by the Macedonian police, was taken to an Afghan black site by a plane which had stopped at Shannon Airport on it's way to North Macedonia to pick him up. In response Amnesty International Ireland reported that "the Irish Government knew that the CIA used Shannon Airport as part of their renditions operations" and called for an independent investigation into the use of Shannon Airport for extraordinary renditions operation by the USA.

Facilities

Overview 
The current airport terminal was opened on 27 March 2000 by then Minister of Transport Mary O'Rourke. This facility has 40 check-in desks, five baggage carousels and 14 boarding gates (including six airbridges). There are nearly 20 aircraft parking stands. The car parks can hold 4,200 cars.

Much of the older landside section of the airport has been renovated with new 'Shannon Airport' branding. An airside area renovation and passenger separation project was completed in Summer 2010.

When Eirjet existed, its head office was located on the grounds of Shannon Airport.

U.S. Customs and Border Protection pre-clearance 
In 1986, a United States border preclearance facility was opened at Shannon, eliminating the need to go through immigration on arrival in the United States. In November 2008, it was announced that customs and agriculture inspections would be added, making Shannon the first airport in Europe to offer this service, and to enable passengers to arrive in New York on a "domestic" basis. To have these facilities put in place, a two-storey,  extension to the main terminal building was constructed. The facility opened the morning of 5 August 2009.

As of September 2016, Shannon Airport also is the first and only airport in Europe to offer U.S. border preclearance to private aircraft.

Security
In 2021, Shannon Airport deployed CT scanners at passenger security checkpoints, enabling it to lift the restrictions on liquids which had been in place since 2006.

Airlines and destinations

Passenger 

The following airlines operate regular scheduled and charter flights to and from Shannon:

Cargo 
The following cargo carriers are operating from Shannon Airport:

Statistics

Passenger numbers

Busiest routes

Ground transportation

Road 

Shannon Airport is the end destination of the N19 national route, which connects to the N18/M18 Limerick–Ennis–Galway route. It is also the western end of European road E20. A dual carriageway section of the N19 was finished in 2004, bypassing the town of Shannon, and a new interchange and dual carriageway north to Ennis were completed in 2007 on the N18 (M18).

Bus 
Bus Éireann services from/to the airport:
 Route 51: Galway – Limerick – Cork
 Route 343: Limerick – Shannon – Ennis

Car hire 
Car hire is available in the arrivals hall of the terminal building, with five car rental firms operating at the airport. Private-hire coaches and buses are available from many operators such as Eirebus; these need to be pre-booked and can transport passengers to any destination throughout Ireland.

Car parking 
Shannon Airport offers both short-term and long-term parking within the airport with over 5,000 spaces available. All car parks operate 24 hours and are regularly patrolled by Airport Police.

Rail link 
For many years a rail link to the airport (as a spur from the nearby Limerick–Ennis line) has been proposed, but nothing has materialised. The nearest major stations (Ennis railway station and Limerick railway station) require bus or taxi to connect with. Sixmilebridge is the nearest station to the airport.

Accidents and incidents 

Due to the location of Shannon, it receives a large number of emergency stopovers.

 16 July 1943 – British Overseas Airways Corporation de Havilland DH91 Fortuna crash-landed short of the Runway 14 threshold. There were no injuries.
 18 June 1946 – an Aer Lingus Douglas DC-3, EI-ACA, Charlie Alpha, on a domestic flight from Rineanna to Dublin crashed shortly after takeoff with only minor injuries reported. The aircraft made a wheels-up landing short of the runway and was damaged beyond repair.
 28 December 1946 – TWA Lockheed Constellation NC86505 Flight 6963 crashed attempting to land at the airport in poor visibility. The aircraft was routing Paris, Shannon, Gander, New York. The aircraft crashed on its second attempt short of runway 14 on Inishmacnaughtan Island.
 15 April 1948 – Pan Am Flight 1-10, a Lockheed Constellation crashed attempting to land at the airport. 30 Passengers and crew died in the post crash fire. There was 1 survivor.
 5 September 1954 – Lockheed Super Constellation PH-LKY, KLM Flight 633 from Amsterdam to New York City, using Shannon as a refuelling stop, crashed just after takeoff into a mudbank adjacent to the airport. 28 people on board died. There were 28 survivors.
 15 July 1956 – a Swissair Convair CV-440-11 crashed on approach to the airport due to pilot error. The aircraft was on its delivery flight from San Diego, California to Zürich via New York, Gander and Shannon. The crash killed all four crew on board.
 14 August 1958 – Lockheed Super Constellation PH-LKM KLM Flight 607-E from Amsterdam to New York crashed into the Atlantic Ocean after a refuelling stop at Shannon, killing all 99 passengers and crew on board.
 22 June 1959 - Pan American DC-6B N5026K, Clipper Panama, caught fire and burned on the runway as it was preparing to take off. The aircraft was preparing for a flight to New York. The number 1 propeller blade on the number 4 engine detached due to metal fatigue.  The imbalance on the spinning propeller caused the engine to detach from the engine housing and a fire erupted on the wing. The 8 occupants escaped from the aircraft which was subsequently destroyed by fire.
 26 February 1960 – an Alitalia Douglas DC-7C I-DUVO crashed after the port wingtip struck the wall of a cemetery  after taking off from the airport. The aircraft had made an unscheduled refuelling stop en route from Rome to New York. The aircraft had not gained sufficient height to clear the hilltop where the cemetery is located. The aircraft then crashed in the field where it exploded and disintegrated, scattering wreckage over a wide area. 34 people out of 52 passengers and crew on board died as a result of the accident. One cabin crew member, a steward who was seated at the rear of the aircraft survived the accident.
 26 March 1961 - An Eagle Airways DC-6A G-APOM was damaged and subsequently destroyed by fire during a touch and go training exercise.  The aircraft had landed on runway 24 and was accelerating for takeoff when the landing gear was inadvertently raised before the aircraft became airborne. The DC-6 settled onto the runway, veered to the left off the paved surface and onto the grass.  A fire began on the port wing and eventually consumed and destroyed the aircraft.  There were no injuries among the 6 crew who evacuated the aircraft.
 10 September 1961 – a President Airlines Douglas DC-6 crashed into the river Shannon after taking off from the airport on a flight to Gander. The disaster killed all 83 passengers and crew, one of the worst air disasters in Ireland's history. 1 cabin crew member survived the crash but died a few hours after being rescued.
 30 September 1977 – an Interconair Bristol 175 Britannia 253 EI-BBY crashed in a field to the right of runway 24 after severe vibration on the approach. The left wing broke off and caught fire but none of the six crew were injured in the crash.
 2 October 1977 - Capitol Air DC-8-61 N911CL aborted takeoff on runway 24 as it accelerated for takeoff en route Rome-Shannon-Windsor Locks. There was a failure of tyres on the left main wheel bogie during taxi and as the aircraft accelerated the tyre shredded and sent tyre fragments up into the wing underside and caused the fuel tanks to rupture. The escaping fuel ignited and caused a rapid large fire under the left wing. ATC spotted the fire as did the crew of a sister aircraft which was taxying in after landing. The aircraft was just at the point of V1 when takeoff was abandoned and the DC-8 decelerated and stopped just short of the end of runway 24. The aircraft was evacuated and approximately 50 passengers were injured during the evacuation. The aircraft was seriously damaged but repaired and returned to service a number of months later. Had the aircraft become airborne it is likely the left wing would have failed and the aircraft would have crashed.
 20 June 1979 – American Airlines Flight 293 landed in Shannon after being hijacked.

Environmental issues 
As Shannon Airport has been built adjacent to the Shannon Estuary, it is likely to have problems with rising sea levels and high waters in the Shannon. The government is working on plans to protect both the airport and the town.

References

External links 

 
 
 

Transport in County Clare
Airports with United States border preclearance
Airports in the Republic of Ireland
Airports established in 1942
1942 establishments in Ireland